Dachengshan is a hill in central Tangshan, Hebei. Covering an area of more than 1,180,000 m2, Dachengshan is north of the Phoenix Peak. The Dacheng Hill previously called Tangshan Hill. 

Parks in Hebei
Tourist attractions in Hebei
Hills of China